Alafoti Fa'osiliva (born 28 October 1985) is a rugby union player for English club Worcester Warriors in the Aviva Premiership and in the national Samoa team.

Early life
Fa'osiliva grew up in the village of Afega, situated on the central north coast of Upolu island. He attended the local Sagaga Primary School followed by neighbouring Leulumoega College. In 2004, at the age of 19, he was selected for the Samoa Under 21 team. He also plays for the national Samoa national rugby union team.

Club career
Faosiliva joined Bristol in the summer of 2012. He made his first start in the RFU Championship game against London Scottish on 29 November 2012 at the Memorial Stadium.

After leaving Bristol, Fao'siliva joined Bath Rugby in the Aviva Premiership for the 2013/14 season. On 13 May 2016 it was confirmed he had been released from Bath due to a recent guilty plea for assault and consequent suspended custodial sentence.

On 2 August 2016, Faosiliva signed for local rivals Worcester Warriors from the 2016–17 season, following his release from Bath. This was followed by a move to Championship club Bedford Blues in the 19–20 season. He is now lead player coach at Chippenham RFC.

International career
Fa’osiliva was part of the Samoa national rugby sevens team that won the 2009–10 IRB Sevens World Series. He was nominated for the 2010 IRB International Sevens Player of the Year alongside team captain Lolo Lui and Mikaele Pesamino. 
He represented the Samoa 15s team during the 2015 Rugby World Cup.

References

External links
 Official Samoa Rugby Union website
 

Living people
Samoan rugby union players
1985 births
Male rugby sevens players
Samoa international rugby union players
Samoan expatriate rugby union players
Expatriate rugby union players in France
Expatriate rugby union players in England
Samoan expatriate sportspeople in France
Samoan expatriate sportspeople in England
RC Toulonnais players
Bristol Bears players
Samoa international rugby sevens players
People from Tuamasaga